The Play-offs of the 2005 Fed Cup Asia/Oceania Zone Group I were the final stages of the Group I Zonal Competition involving teams from Asia and Oceania. Using the positions determined in their pools, the nine teams faced off to determine their placing in the 2005 Fed Cup Asia/Oceania Zone Group I, the top two countries of each pool played for first to fourth placings, while the bottom two of each pool competed for fifth to eighth. The teams that ended up placing first overall advanced to World Group play-offs, whilst those coming in seventh were relegated down to Group II for the next year.

Promotion play-offs
The first placed teams of each pool were placed against each other in a head-to-head round. The winner of the rounds advanced to the World Group II play-offs, where they would get a chance to advance to the World Group II for next year.

China vs. Australia

Third to Fourth play-off
The second placed teams of each pool were placed against each other in a tie. The winner of the tie was allocated third place in the Group while the loser was allocated fourth.

India vs. South Korea

Relegation play-offs
The last and second-to-last placed teams of each pool were placed against each other in two head-to-head rounds. The losing team of the rounds were relegated to Group II for next year.

Kazakhstan vs. Chinese Taipei

Singapore vs. New Zealand

Final Placements

  advanced to the World Group II Play-offs, and were drawn against , where they won 4–1. The team thus competed in the 2006 World Group II.
Thus, the Kazakhstanis achieved advancement back to Group I for 2007.

See also
Fed Cup structure

References

External links
 Fed Cup website

2005 Fed Cup Asia/Oceania Zone